Kazi Hayat (born 15 February 1947, although in a newspaper Hayat claimed that he was born on 13 April 1948) is a Bangladeshi film director, producer, writer, and actor.

Hayat won Bangladesh National Film Awards eight times - Best Story for Dayi Ke (1987), Best Dialogue and Best Screenplay for Traash (1992), Best Story for Chandabaz (1993), Best Director and Best Screenplay for Desh Premik (1994), Best Cinematography for Ammajan (1999), and  Best Director for Itihas (2002).

Career
Hayat started his career as an assistant director in 1974. He debuted his directorial career with the film The Father (1979). In 2014, he released Shorbonasha Yabaa starring Kazi Maruf and Prosun Azad.

In January 2017, Hayat started working on his 50th film titled Ghum, casting Moushumi.

Personal life
Hayat's son Kazi Maruf is an actor.

In January 2022, Hayat was admitted to United Hospital's intensive care unit (ICU) due to myocardial infarction (MI).

Filmography

Director

Actor

Music video

References

External links
 

Living people
Bangladeshi film directors
Bangladeshi film producers
Bangladeshi theatre directors
Best Director National Film Award (Bangladesh) winners
1948 births
Best Screenplay National Film Award (Bangladesh) winners
Best Dialogue National Film Award (Bangladesh) winners
Best Story National Film Award (Bangladesh) winners